Mohamed Meddeb (born 9 August 1981) is a Tunisian former athlete specializing in the shot put.

His personal best of 18.51 metres (2006) is the current national record. He finished 3rd in the shot put at the African Championships in Athletics in both 2002 and 2006.

References

1981 births
Living people
Tunisian male shot putters
Place of birth missing (living people)
21st-century Tunisian people